Sports City Stadium is a proposed football stadium which will be built in Doha, Qatar.

Description
The stadium was designed by the architecture firm MEIS Architects. It should hold 49,000 seats and its construction costs $1.6 billion.

The large structure is planned to also house a convention center, a water park, a mall-in-the-sky, a luxury hotel, a cultural center, a sports museum, an amphitheatre, and a business center.

The inspiration for the design comes from the bedouin tents. The roof is partially retractable.

After the World Cup, it is the only stadium in Qatar which seating capacity will remain unchanged.

The energy to power the building is sun-generated on the roof. A complex cooling system is planned for the stadium's spectators and players. The building is zero-carbon emissions proof.

World cup matches hosted

The stadium will host group matches, and the 3rd place playoff.

References 

Proposed stadiums
Proposed buildings and structures in Qatar